This is a list of 123 species in Hypocaccus, a genus of clown beetles in the family Histeridae.

Hypocaccus species

 Hypocaccus acorni Bousquet and Laplante, 2006 i c g
 Hypocaccus acridens (Schmidt, 1890) i c g
 Hypocaccus aequabilis (Reichardt, 1932) i c g
 Hypocaccus ainu Lewis, 1899 i c g
 Hypocaccus amabilis (Penati and Vienna, 1995) i c g
 Hypocaccus angulosus (Wollaston, 1864) i c g
 Hypocaccus araneicola (Desbordes, 1930) i c g
 Hypocaccus ascendens (Reichardt, 1932) i c g
 Hypocaccus asiaticus (Mazur, 1975) i c g
 Hypocaccus asticus Lewis, 1911 i c g
 Hypocaccus axeli Kryzhanovskij in Kryzhanovskij and Reichardt, 1976 i c g
 Hypocaccus balux (Reichardt, 1932) i c g
 Hypocaccus basilewskyi (Thérond, 1955) i c g
 Hypocaccus baudii (Schmidt, 1890) i c g
 Hypocaccus becvari Gomy, 2009 i c g
 Hypocaccus beneteaui (Gomy, 1986) i c
 Hypocaccus bigemmeus (J. L. LeConte, 1851) i c g b
 Hypocaccus bigener (J. E. LeConte, 1844) i c g b
 Hypocaccus brahminius (Marseul, 1864) i c g
 Hypocaccus brasiliensis (Paykull, 1811) i c g b
 Hypocaccus callani Thérond, 1958 i c g
 Hypocaccus canariensis (Thérond, 1966) i c g
 Hypocaccus consobrinus (Fall, 1901) i c g
 Hypocaccus consputus (Marseul, 1855) i c g
 Hypocaccus controversus (G. Müller, 1937) i c g
 Hypocaccus crassipes (Erichson, 1834) i c g
 Hypocaccus cupreolus (Vienna in Penati and Vienna, 1993) i c g
 Hypocaccus dauricus Reichardt, 1930 i c g
 Hypocaccus densus (Casey, 1924) i c g
 Hypocaccus dimidiatipennis (J. E. LeConte, 1824) i c g b
 Hypocaccus dimidiatus (Illiger, 1807) i c g
 Hypocaccus disjunctus (Marseul, 1855) i c g
 Hypocaccus dyolofensis (Gomy, 2004) i c g
 Hypocaccus emendatus (Peyerimhoff, 1917) i c g
 Hypocaccus eremobius (Reichardt, 1932) i c g
 Hypocaccus erosus (Wollaston, 1864) i c g
 Hypocaccus estriatus (J. L. LeConte, 1857) i c g b
 Hypocaccus ferreri (Yélamos, 1992) i c g
 Hypocaccus ferrugineus (Marseul, 1855) i c g
 Hypocaccus fitchi (Marseul, 1862) i c g b
 Hypocaccus fochi (Auzat, 1921) i c g
 Hypocaccus formosus Reichardt, 1941 i c g
 Hypocaccus fraternus (Say, 1825) i c g b
 Hypocaccus fugax (Marseul, 1857) i c g
 Hypocaccus fugitivus (Desbordes, 1925) i c g
 Hypocaccus gaudens (J. L. LeConte, 1851) i c g b
 Hypocaccus gemmeus (Lewis, 1888) i c g
 Hypocaccus gienae (Vienna and Kanaar, 1996) i c g
 Hypocaccus grandini (Marseul, 1870) i c g
 Hypocaccus gridellii (G. Müller, 1929) i c g
 Hypocaccus grosclaudei (Normand, 1935) i c g
 Hypocaccus hirsutus Lackner, 2015 i c g
 Hypocaccus hosseinius (A. Théry, 1921) i c g
 Hypocaccus interpunctatus (Schmidt, 1885) i c g
 Hypocaccus iris (Fall, 1919) i c g b
 Hypocaccus janatii Gomy in Gomy et al., 2014 i c g
 Hypocaccus japhonis (Schmidt, 1890) i c g
 Hypocaccus kidpaddlei Gomy, 2008 i c g
 Hypocaccus kincaidi McGrath and Hatch, 1941 i c g
 Hypocaccus kiseritzkyi (Reichardt, 1932) i c g
 Hypocaccus kochi (Thérond, 1958) i c g
 Hypocaccus laevis Thérond, 1963 i c g
 Hypocaccus lewisii (Schmidt, 1890) i c g
 Hypocaccus lopatini Tishechkin, 2005 i c g
 Hypocaccus lucidulus (J. L. LeConte, 1851) i c g b
 Hypocaccus lustrans (Casey, 1926) i c g
 Hypocaccus lyleae Gomy and Vienna, 2011 i c g
 Hypocaccus malabaricus (Reichardt, 1932) i c g
 Hypocaccus marginatus (Vienna and Yélamos, 1997) i c g
 Hypocaccus metallicus (Herbst, 1791) i c g
 Hypocaccus minor Dahlgren, 1985 i c g
 Hypocaccus mongolicus (Reichardt, 1932) i c g
 Hypocaccus mundus (Wollaston, 1864) i c g
 Hypocaccus nigrocaeruleus (Thérond, 1960) i c g
 Hypocaccus occator (Reichardt, 1932) i c g
 Hypocaccus occidentalis Thérond, 1963 i c g
 Hypocaccus omissus (Casey, 1916) i c g
 Hypocaccus orbus (Reichardt, 1932) i c g
 Hypocaccus oxytropis (Reichardt, 1932) i c g
 Hypocaccus paivae (Wollaston, 1867) i c g
 Hypocaccus patruelis (J. E. LeConte, 1845) i c g b
 Hypocaccus pavianus (Bickhardt, 1921) i c g
 Hypocaccus pelleti (Marseul, 1862) i c g
 Hypocaccus penatii Gomy, 2009 i c g
 Hypocaccus perparvulus (Desbordes, 1916) i c g
 Hypocaccus persanus (Marseul, 1876) i c g
 Hypocaccus phasanicus (Peyerimhoff, 1946) i c g
 Hypocaccus propensus (Casey, 1893) i c g
 Hypocaccus puncticollis (Küster, 1849) i c g
 Hypocaccus roeri Vienna, 1979 i c g
 Hypocaccus rubiciliae Lewis, 1899 i c g
 Hypocaccus rubripes (Erichson, 1834) i c g
 Hypocaccus rufipes (Kugelann, 1792) i c g
 Hypocaccus rugiceps (Duftschmid, 1805) i c g
 Hypocaccus rugifrons (Paykull, 1798) i c g
 Hypocaccus schmidti (Théry, 1897) i c g
 Hypocaccus schulzei (Schmidt, 1887) i c g
 Hypocaccus seminitens (J. L. LeConte, 1863) i c g b
 Hypocaccus serrulatus (J. L. LeConte, 1851) i c g
 Hypocaccus servilis (Casey, 1893) i c g
 Hypocaccus simplicisternus (Vienna, 1985) i c g
 Hypocaccus sinae (Marseul, 1862) i c g
 Hypocaccus snizeki Gomy, 2009 i c g
 Hypocaccus somaliensis (Vienna, 1990) i c g
 Hypocaccus sparsus (Casey, 1916) i c g b
 Hypocaccus specillum (Marseul, 1855) i c g
 Hypocaccus specularis (Marseul, 1855) i c g
 Hypocaccus speculifer (Vienna, 1994) i c g
 Hypocaccus speculum (Schmidt, 1884) i c g
 Hypocaccus strigithorax Hinton, 1935 i c g
 Hypocaccus subaeneus (Schmidt, 1890) i c g
 Hypocaccus teretrioides (Schmidt, 1889) i c g
 Hypocaccus texaco Mazur, 1991 i c g
 Hypocaccus tigris (Marseul, 1862) i c g
 Hypocaccus transbaicalicus (Reichardt, 1932) i c g
 Hypocaccus varians (Schmidt, 1890) i c g
 Hypocaccus vernulus (Blackburn, 1903) i c g
 Hypocaccus vethi (Bickhardt, 1912) i c g
 Hypocaccus virescens (Thérond, 1963) i c g
 Hypocaccus vlasovi (Kryzhanovskij, 1966) i c g
 Hypocaccus vulturnus (Reichardt, 1932) i c g
 Hypocaccus wittei (Thérond, 1952) i c g
 Hypocaccus zanzibaricus (Reichardt, 1932) i c g

Data sources: i = ITIS, c = Catalogue of Life, g = GBIF, b = Bugguide.net

References

Hypocaccus
Articles created by Qbugbot